Lesogorsk is the name of several inhabited localities in Russia.

Urban localities
Lesogorsk, Irkutsk Oblast, a work settlement in Chunsky District of Irkutsk Oblast
Lesogorsk (work settlement), Nizhny Novgorod Oblast, a work settlement in Shatkovsky District, Nizhny Novgorod Oblast

Rural localities
Lesogorsk (station settlement), Nizhny Novgorod Oblast, a station settlement under the administrative jurisdiction of the work settlement of  Lesogorsk, Shatkovsky District, Nizhny Novgorod Oblast

Historical names
Lesogorsk, name of the selo of Lesogorskoye, Uglegorsky District, Sakhalin Oblast until 1993